Eschines Pierson Matthews (September 11, 1832 – July 30, 1913) was an American businessman, manufacturer, and politician.

Born in Painesville, Ohio, Matthews moved to Milwaukee, Wisconsin in 1857. Matthews and his brothers started Matthew Brothers a furniture manufacturing business. Matthews served on the Milwaukee Common Council and was a Republican. In 1881, Matthews served in the Wisconsin State Assembly. Matthews died at his home, in Milwaukee, Wisconsin, after suffering ill health.

Notes

1832 births
1913 deaths
People from Painesville, Ohio
Politicians from Milwaukee
Businesspeople from Milwaukee
Wisconsin city council members
Republican Party members of the Wisconsin State Assembly
19th-century American politicians
19th-century American businesspeople